Politte Elvins (March 16, 1878 – January 14, 1943) was a U.S. Representative from Missouri's 13th congressional district.

Born in French Village. St. Francois County, Missouri, Elvins attended the public schools.
He graduated from Carleton College, Farmington, Missouri, in 1897 and from the law department of the University of Missouri in 1899.
He was admitted to the bar the same year and commenced practice in Elvins, Missouri.

Elvins was elected as a Republican to the Sixty-first Congress (March 4, 1909 – March 3, 1911).
He was an unsuccessful candidate for reelection in 1910 to the Sixty-second Congress.
He resumed the practice of law in Elvins, Missouri.
He served as delegate to the 1912 Republican National Convention.
He served as chairman of the State Republican committee 1912–1914.
He moved to Bonne Terre, Missouri, in 1917 and continued the practice of law.
He served as member and chairman of the committee on rules and order of business for the Missouri constitutional convention in 1922 and 1923.
He moved to Pharr, Texas, in 1936.
He was an unsuccessful candidate to the United States Senate in 1940.
He died in McAllen, Texas, January 14, 1943.
His remains were cremated.

References

1878 births
1943 deaths
University of Missouri School of Law alumni
People from Pharr, Texas
Republican Party members of the United States House of Representatives from Missouri
People from St. Francois County, Missouri
People from Park Hills, Missouri
People from Bonne Terre, Missouri